Thinornis is a genus of plovers, comprising two extant and threatened species. It is sometimes considered a synonym of Charadrius.

Taxonomy
The genus Thinornis was introduced in 1844 by the English zoologist George Robert Gray to accommodate a single species, Thinornis rossii G.R. Gray which is now considered a junior synonym of Charadrius movaeseelandiae J.F. Gmelin, the shore plover. The genus name combines the Ancient Greek this meaning "beach" or "sand" with ornis meaning "bird".

The genus contains two species:
Hooded dotterel or hooded plover (Thinornis cucullatus)
Shore plover or shore dotterel (Thinornis novaeseelandiae)

A third species, the Auckland Islands shore plover (Thinornis rossii), known from just one specimen collected in 1840, is now generally considered to be a juvenile shore plover whose location was incorrectly recorded.

Gallery

References

Further reading 
Les Christidis, Walter Boles: Systematics and Taxonomy of Australian Birds. CSIRO Publishing. 2008. 

 
Bird genera
 
Taxa named by George Robert Gray